1924 in philosophy

Events 
The Vienna Circle was formed in 1924.
Louis De Broglie's contribution in the Philosophical Magazine will subsequently be viewed as a crucial contribution to the birth of quantum mechanics, leading to a revolution in the philosophy of science.

Publications 
 Max Scheler, Problems of a Sociology of Knowledge (1924)

Philosophical literature 
 Yevgeny Zamyatin, We (1924)

Births 
 January 13 - Paul Feyerabend (died 1994)
 March 27 - Harry Stopes-Roe (died 2014)
 April 14 - Mary Warnock (died 2019)
 June 13 – Bronisław Baczko, Polish philosopher, historian of ideas (died 2016)
 June 21 - Jean Laplanche (died 2012)
 August 10 - Jean-François Lyotard (died 1998)
 September 27 - Ernest Becker (died 1974)
 November 7 - Anđelko Habazin, Yugoslav/Croatian philosopher (d. 1978)

Deaths 
 January 21 - Vladimir Lenin (born 1870)
 July 13 - Alfred Marshall (born 1842)

References 

1924
20th-century philosophy
Philosophy by year